The Reserve Division of Benxi was activated in October 1983 in Benxi, Liaoning. The division was then composed of:
1st Garrison Regiment - Huanren
2nd Garrison Regiment - Benxi
3rd Garrison Regiment
Artillery Regiment - Benxi Steel Group

The division was composed of 14,567 personnel.

In November 1985 it was redesignated as the Reserve Garrison Division of Benxi(). 

In March 1988 the division was further redesignated as the Reserve Infantry Division of Benxi(). The division was then composed of:
1st Infantry Regiment - Huanren
2nd Infantry Regiment - Benxi
3rd Infantry Regiment - Fengcheng
Artillery Regiment - Benxi Steel Group

On December 1, 1998, the division was merged into the 192nd Infantry Division as the 192nd Reserve Infantry Division of Liaoning Provincial Military District.

References

Reserve divisions of the People's Liberation Army
Military units and formations established in 1983